Lithuanian National Opera and Ballet Theatre (LNOBT) is an opera house and ballet theatre in Vilnius, Lithuania, founded 1920, new opera palace was built in 1974. Apart from standard Western and Russian repertory works, the opera also performs national operas. Vytautas Klova's opera Pilėnai (1956), has since 2001 been performed outdoors during the summer at Trakai Island Castle. Bronius Kutavičius' opera Lokys (2000), after Prosper Mérimée's short story Lokis the bear, was commissioned by the Vilnius Festival. The ballet has performed several productions by Russian choreographer Boris Eifman, among them Red Giselle.

See also
Lithuanian opera
List of opera houses

References

External links
 Lithuanian Opera Companies in Operabase

Opera houses in Lithuania
Theatres in Vilnius
Ballet in Lithuania
1974 establishments in Lithuania
Performing groups established in 1974
Theatres completed in 1974
Music venues completed in 1974